KPCW is a public radio station in Park City, Utah, serving Summit and Wasatch counties broadcasting at 91.7 FM, Coalville and Kamas at 88.1 FM, and the Heber Valley at 91.9 FM. In addition to local news and information, it carries national and international news from NPR, PRI and the BBC.

KPCW is owned by Community Wireless of Park City.  The programs of KPCW(FM) were also carried on KPMD, 88.1, Evanston, Wyoming until 2011.  Community Wireless also formerly operated KCPW-FM in Salt Lake City, but that station was sold to a new organization, Wasatch Public Media, in 2008. Beginning on March 20, 2009, KCPW (AM) became KPCW (AM) simulcasting its FM sister. Late in August 2009 KPCW (AM) 1010 was sold to Immaculate Heart Radio, is now known as KIHU, and now broadcasts that organization's programs.

Starting in 2016, Community Wireless moved KPCW from 91.9 to 91.7 on May 23 and took ownership of the 107.9 signal that Broadway Media was donating to them after they moved KUDD's Top 40 format to 105.1, where it will replace KAUU's Country format. At the same time, KUDD's sister station, KUUU, will move from 92.5 to 92.3 with expanded coverage in the Salt Lake Valley, thus requiring KPCW's frequency shift.
KUMT was sold to BYU University for in undisclosed amount in April 2018, and is expected to be carrying their BYU Radio format.

Programs
KPCW provides a mix of local news and information, music, and programs from NPR, PRI, and the BBC.

See also
List of community radio stations in the United States

References

External links
 KPCW.org
 

NPR member stations
Park City, Utah
PCW
Community radio stations in the United States